Barbara Cassin (born 24 October 1947) is a French philologist and philosopher. She was elected to the Académie française on 4 May 2018.  Cassin is the recipient of the Grand Prize of Philosophy of the Académie française. She is an Emeritus Research Director at the National Center for Scientific Research (CNRS) in Paris. Cassin is a program Director at the International College of Philosophy and the director of its Scientific Council and member of its board of directors. She was a director of Collège international de philosophie established by Jacques Derrida. In 2006 she succeeded Jonathan Barnes to the directorship of the leading centre of excellence in Ancient philosophy,  Centre Leon-Robin, at the Sorbonne. In recent years she has been teaching seminars and writing books in partnership with Alain Badiou.

Work 
Her work centers on Sophism and rhetoric, and their relation to philosophy. In a footnote in 2007's Logic of Worlds, Alain Badiou portrays her work as a synthesis of Heideggerian thought with the linguistic turn.

From 1991 to 2007, she co-directed with Alain Badiou the series L'Ordre Philosophique, at Le Seuil publishers. She is the series editor of Unesco's journal Revue des Femmes Philosophes

She is the author of L'Effet Sophistique (1995) and the editor of Vocabulaire Européen des Philosophies, (2004) an international collective work of philosophers sponsored by the European Union. She has also written Google-moi. La Deuxième Mission de l'Amérique (2007),

In September 2012, a Cerisy symposium about her works was held, with contributions by Étienne Balibar, Fernando Santoro, Michel Deguy, Souleymane Bachir Diagne, Philippe-Joseph Salazar and Alain Badiou, among others. Barbara Cassin is also an art curator and her exhibition of translation is highly acclaimed.

Publications

 Nostalgia: When Are We Ever at Home?. Fordham University Press, 2016 
 Heidegger – His Life and His Philosophy. with Alain Badiou, Columbia University Press, 2016 
 Sophistical Practice: Toward a Consistent Relativism. Fordham University Press, 2014 
 There′s No Such Thing as a Sexual Relationship – Two Lessons on Lacan. with Alain Badiou, Columbia University Press, 2017 
 Jacques the Sophist: Lacan, Logos, and Psychoanalysis. Fordham University Press, 2019

See also
 Women in philosophy
 List of women philosophers
 Alain Badiou
 Hannah Arendt
 Sophists
 Linguistic turn
 Lacanianism

References

External links
Barbara Cassin Bio with http://frenchculture.org
Biography with CNRS
Lecture of political concepts

1947 births
Living people
People from Boulogne-Billancourt
20th-century French philosophers
21st-century French philosophers
French scholars of ancient Greek philosophy
French women philosophers
French philologists
Women philologists
Jewish philosophers
French hellenists
Lycée Pasteur (Neuilly-sur-Seine) alumni
Lycée Condorcet alumni
Members of the Académie Française
Chevaliers of the Légion d'honneur
Officers of the Ordre national du Mérite
20th-century French women
21st-century French women
Research directors of the French National Centre for Scientific Research